Russell C. Davis (born October 22, 1938) is a retired United States Air Force lieutenant general who served as commander of the District of Columbia National Guard and Chief of the National Guard Bureau.

Early life
Russell C. Davis was born in Tuskegee, Alabama, on October 22, 1938, and graduated from Tuskegee Institute High School.  As recounted in a speech at Simpson College, Davis's great-great grandfather, a former slave, helped raise money to found what now is known as Tuskegee University.  Davis's grandfather worked with George Washington Carver at Tuskegee, and Davis related that when he was a child attending a nursery school on campus, Carver was still a well-known figure at the school, the "tall man in a lab coat who gave us children candy."

He began his military career in 1958 as an aviation cadet in the United States Air Force, and he received his commission in 1960.  Following pilot training, he was assigned at Lincoln Air Force Base, Nebraska, and he graduated from the University of Nebraska Omaha with a Bachelor of Arts degree in general education in 1963.  After serving as a bomber pilot, he was released from active duty in April, 1965 and joined the Iowa Air National as an interceptor pilot.

Start of National Guard career
Upon release from active duty, Davis joined the 132nd Fighter Wing, Iowa Air National Guard in Des Moines.  He served in numerous command and staff positions from squadron pilot to director of operations, and advanced through the ranks to colonel.

In 1969, Davis completed his Juris Doctor degree at Drake University and became an attorney.  He actively practiced until 1979, when he went back on active duty with the Air National Guard.  Davis graduated from the Air Command and Staff College in 1973 and the Industrial College of the Armed Forces in 1979.

Later National Guard career
In June, 1979 Davis was appointed as chief of manpower and personnel at the Air National Guard Support Center, Andrews Air Force Base, Maryland.  From March 1980 to January 1982, he was executive officer to the director of the Air National Guard.

From February 1982 to July 1990, he commanded the 113th Tactical Fighter Wing, and he was promoted to brigadier general in December, 1982.  Davis was the first African-American to become a general officer in the Air National Guard.

In 1989 Davis graduated from the National and International Security Management Course at Harvard University.

Davis was the assistant for national guard matters for the commander of the Tactical Air Command from July, 1990 to December, 1991.  He was promoted to major general in August, 1990.

D.C. National Guard
In December 1991 Davis was appointed commander of the District of Columbia National Guard.  He served in this position until December 1995.

National Guard Bureau
In December 1995 Davis was appointed Vice Chief of the National Guard Bureau.  He held this post until August, 1998, when he was named chief of the National Guard Bureau and promoted to lieutenant general.  Davis was the first African-American to serve as NGB chief, and he held the position until retiring on November 1, 2002.

At the time of his retirement, Davis was the last member of the U.S. Air Force Aviation Cadet program to still be serving on active duty in the U.S. Air Force.

Retirement
Davis was active in several educational and civic endeavors, including serving as member of the Drake University board of trustees and president of National Tuskegee Airmen, Inc. He also works as a consultant in national securities, homeland security/defense, aviation operations and safety, training and development, equal opportunity and diversity and a wide variety of legal issues.

Education

1963 Bachelor of Arts degree in general education, University of Nebraska, Omaha
1969 Juris Doctor degree in law, Drake University, Des Moines, Iowa
1973 Air Command and Staff College, by correspondence
1975 National Security Management Course, by correspondence
1979 Industrial College of the Armed Forces, Fort Lesley J. McNair, Washington, D.C.
1989 National and International Security Management Course, Harvard University, Cambridge, Massachusetts

Assignments

 December 1958 – March 1960, undergraduate pilot training, Graham Air Base, Florida and Vance AFB, Oklahoma
 March 1960 – October 1960, strategic bombardment pilot, 4347th Combat Crew Training Wing, McConnell AFB, Kansas
 October 1960 – April 1965, bomber pilot, 344th Bomber Squadron, Lincoln AFB, Nebraska
 April 1965 – September 1968, pilot, 124th Fighter Interceptor Squadron, Iowa ANG, Des Moines
 September 1968 – September 1970, flight commander, 124th Tactical Fighter Squadron, Iowa National Guard, Des Moines
 September 1970 – June 1977, air operations officer, 132nd Tactical Fighter Group, Iowa ANG, Des Moines
 June 1977 – October 1978, officer in charge, Command Post, 132nd Tactical Fighter Wing, Iowa ANG, Des Moines
 October 1978 – June 1979, deputy commander of operations, Headquarters Iowa ANG, Des Moines
 June 1979 – February 1980, deputy chief of manpower and personnel, Air National Guard Support Center, Andrews AFB, Maryland
 March 1980 – January 1982, executive to the chief of the National Guard Bureau, the Pentagon, Washington, D.C.
 February 1982 – July 1990, wing commander, 113th Tactical Fighter Wing, District of Columbia ANG, Andrews AFB, Maryland
 July 1990 – December 1991, Air National Guard assistant to the commander of Tactical Air Command, Langley AFB, Virginia
 December 1991 – December 1995, commanding general, District of Columbia National Guard, Washington, D.C.
 December 1995 – August 1998, vice chief, NGB, the Pentagon, Washington, D.C.
 August 1998 – November 2002, chief, NGB, Arlington, Virginia

Flight information
Rating: Command pilot
Flight hours: More than 4,700
Aircraft flown: B-47, T-33, F-89, F-84, F-100, A-7, F-4 and F-16

Awards and decorations

Other awards and achievements

1956–1958: University scholar, Tuskegee University
1969: Jury Award, Drake University Law School
1984: NAACP Roy Wilkins Achievement Award
1985: Air Force Association Service Award, Air Force Association Headquarters
1985: Tuskegee Airmen Achievement Award
1987: Tuskegee Airmen Achievement and Service Award
1988: Ira Eaker Fellow, Tony Anthony Chapter, AFA
1990: Howard Kacy Flying Safety Award, District of Columbia ANG
1992–1998: Drake University Board of Trustees
2012 Carver Medal, Simpson College

Effective dates of promotion

References

Attribution

External links

1938 births
Living people
Air Command and Staff College alumni
Chiefs of the National Guard Bureau
Drake University Law School alumni
Dwight D. Eisenhower School for National Security and Resource Strategy alumni
Harvard University alumni
Iowa lawyers
Military personnel from Tuskegee, Alabama
National Guard (United States) generals
Recipients of the Air Force Distinguished Service Medal
Recipients of the Legion of Merit
United States Air Force generals
University of Nebraska alumni